The 1889 Wimbledon Championships took place on the outdoor grass courts at the All England Lawn Tennis Club in Wimbledon, London, United Kingdom. The tournament ran from 1 July until 13 July. It was the 13th staging of the Wimbledon Championships, and the first Grand Slam tennis event of 1889. William Renshaw won his seventh singles title, which as late as 1977 was thought to be a feat unlikely to ever be surpassed. However, in 2000 Pete Sampras equaled this total, and in 2012 Roger Federer also won a seventh title. Ultimately the record was broken by Federer in 2017 when he became the first man to win eight singles titles at Wimbledon. The Renshaw brothers were also unbeaten in doubles for seven years.  The men's doubles were played after completion of the singles competitions.

Champions

Men's singles

 William Renshaw defeated  Ernest Renshaw, 6–4, 6–1, 3–6, 6–0

Women's singles

 Blanche Hillyard defeated  Lena Rice, 4–6, 8–6, 6–4

Men's doubles

 Ernest Renshaw /  William Renshaw defeated  George Hillyard /  Ernest Lewis 6–4, 6–4, 3–6, 0–6, 6–1

References

External links
 Official Wimbledon Championships Website

 
Wimbledon Championships
Wimbledon Championships
Wimbledon Championships
July 1889 sports events